This comparison of programming languages compares the features of language syntax (format) for over 50 computer programming languages.

Expressions 
Programming language expressions can be broadly classified into four syntax structures:

prefix notation
 Lisp (* (+ 2 3) (expt 4 5))
infix notation
 Fortran (2 + 3) * (4 ** 5)
suffix, postfix, or Reverse Polish notation
 Forth 2 3 + 4 5 ** *
math-like notation
 TUTOR (2 + 3)(45) $$ note implicit multiply operator

Statements 
When a programming languages has statements, they typically have conventions for:

 statement separators;
 statement terminators; and
 line continuation

A statement separator demarcates the boundary between two separate statements. A statement terminator defines the end of an individual statement. Languages that interpret the end of line to be the end of a statement are called "line-oriented" languages.

"Line continuation" is a convention in line-oriented languages where the newline character could potentially be misinterpreted as a statement terminator. In such languages, it allows a single statement to span more than just one line.

Line continuation 
Line continuation is generally done as part of lexical analysis: a newline normally results in a token being added to the token stream, unless line continuation is detected.

Whitespace – Languages that do not need continuations
 Ada – Lines terminate with semicolon
 C# – Lines terminate with semicolon
 JavaScript – Lines terminate with semicolon (which may be inferred)
 Lua
 OCaml

Ampersand as last character of line
 Fortran 90, Fortran 95, Fortran 2003, Fortran 2008

Backslash as last character of line
 bash and other Unix shells
 C and C++ preprocessor
 Mathematica and Wolfram Language
 Python
 Ruby
 JavaScript – only within single- or double-quoted strings

Backtick as last character of line
 PowerShell

Hyphen as last character of line
 SQL*Plus

Underscore as last character of line
 AutoIt
 Cobra
 Visual Basic
 Xojo

Ellipsis (as three periods–not one special character)
 MATLAB: The ellipsis token need not be the last characters on the line, but any following it will be ignored. (In essence, it begins a comment that extends through (i.e. including) the first subsequent newline character. Contrast this with an inline comment, which extends until the first subsequent newline.)

Comma delimiter as last character of line
 Ruby (comment may follow delimiter)

Left bracket delimiter as last character of line
 Batch file: starting a parenthetical block can allow line continuation
 Ruby: left parenthesis, left square bracket, or left curly bracket

Operator as last object of line
 Ruby (comment may follow operator)

Operator as first character of continued line
 AutoHotkey: Any expression operators except ++ and --, as well as a comma or a period

Backslash as first character of continued line
 Vimscript

Some form of inline comment serves as line continuation
 Turbo Assembler: \
 m4: dnl
 TeX: %

Character position
 Fortran 77: A non-comment line is a continuation of the previous non-comment line if any non-space character appears in column 6.  Comment lines cannot be continued.
 COBOL: String constants may be continued by not ending the original string in a PICTURE clause with ', then inserting a - in column 7 (same position as the * for comment is used.)
 TUTOR: Lines starting with a tab (after any indentation required by the context) continue the previous command.

[End and Begin] using normal quotes
 C and C++ preprocessor: The string is ended normally and continues by starting with a quote on the next line.

Libraries 

To import a library is a way to read external, possibly compiled, routines, programs or packages. Imports can be classified by level (module, package, class, procedure,...) and by syntax (directive name, attributes,...)

File import
 addpath(directory)MATLAB
  COBOL
 :-include("filename"). Prolog
 #include file="filename" ASP
 #include "filename", AutoHotkey, AutoIt, C, C++
 #include <filename>AutoHotkey, AutoIt, C, C++
 #import  "filename", Objective-C
 #import  <filename> Objective-C
  Mathematica and Wolfram Language
  Fortran
 include  "filename";PHP
 include    [filename] program, Pick Basic
 #include   [filename] program Pick Basic
 include!("filename");Rust
 load "filename"Ruby
  Red
  Lua
 require "filename"; Perl, PHP
  Ruby
  R

Package import
 #include filename C, C++
 #[path = "filename"] mod altname;, Rust
 @import module; Objective-C
 <<name Mathematica and Wolfram Language
  Prolog:
 from module import * Python
 extern crate libname;, Rust
 extern crate libname as altname; Rust
 mod modname;, Rust
 library("package") R:
 IMPORT module Oberon
 import altname "package/name" Go:
 import package.module;, D
 import altname = package.module; D
 import Module, Haskell
 import qualified Module as M Haskell
 import package.* Java, MATLAB, kotlin
 import "modname"; JavaScript:
 import altname from "modname";, JavaScript:
 import package Scala
 import package._, Scala
 import module Swift
 import module, Python
  Lua:
 , Ruby
 use module, Fortran 90+
 use module, only : identifier Fortran 90+
 use Module;, Perl
 use Module qw(import options);Perl
 use Package.Name Cobra
 uses unit Pascal
 with package Ada

Class import
 from module import Class Python
 import package.class  Java, MATLAB, kotlin
 import class from "modname";, JavaScript
 import {class} from "modname";, JavaScript
 import {class as altname} from "modname";JavaScript
 import package.class, Scala
 import package.{ class1 => alternativeName, class2 }, Scala
 import package._Scala
 use Namespace\ClassName;, PHP
 use Namespace\ClassName as AliasName;  PHP

Procedure/function import
 from module import function Python: 
 import package.module : symbol;, D: 
 import package.module : altsymbolname = symbol; D: 
 import Module (function) Haskell: 
 import function from "modname";, JavaScript: 
 import {function} from "modname";, JavaScript: 
 import {function as altname} from "modname";JavaScript: 
 import package.function MATLAB: 
 import package.class.function, Scala: 
 import package.class.{ function => alternativeName, otherFunction }Scala: 
 Perl: 
 use function Namespace\function_name;, PHP: 
 use Namespace\function_name as function_alias_name; PHP: 
 use module::submodule::symbol;, Rust: 
 use module::submodule::{symbol1, symbol2};, Rust: 
 use module::submodule::symbol as altname; Rust:

Constant import
 use const Namespace\CONST_NAME; PHP

The above statements can also be classified by whether they are a syntactic convenience (allowing things to be referred to by a shorter name, but they can still be referred to by some fully qualified name without import), or whether they are actually required to access the code (without which it is impossible to access the code, even with fully qualified names).

Syntactic convenience
 import package.* Java
 import package.class Java
 open module OCaml

Required to access code
 import altname "package/name" Go
 import altname from "modname";JavaScript
 import modulePython

Blocks 
A block is a notation for a group of two or more statements, expressions or other units of code that are related in such a way as to comprise a whole.

Braces (a.k.a. curly brackets) { ... }
 Curly bracket programming languages: C, C++, Objective-C, Go, Java, JavaScript/ECMAScript, C#, D, Perl, PHP (for & loop loops, or pass a block as argument), R, Rust, Scala, S-Lang, Swift, PowerShell, Haskell (in do-notation), AutoHotkey

Parentheses ( ... )
 Batchfile, F# (lightweight syntax), OCaml, Prolog, Standard ML
Square brackets [ ... ]
 Rebol, Red, Self, Smalltalk (blocks are first class objects. a.k.a. closures)
begin ... end
 Ada, ALGOL, F# (verbose syntax), Pascal, Ruby (for, do/while & do/until loops), OCaml, SCL, Simula, Erlang.
do ... end
 PL/I, REXX
do ... done
 Bash (for & while loops), F# (verbose syntax) Visual Basic, Fortran, TUTOR (with mandatory indenting of block body), Visual Prolog
do ... end
 Lua, Ruby (pass blocks as arguments, for loop), Seed7 (encloses loop bodies between do and end)
X ... end (e.g. if ... end):
 Ruby (if, while, until, def, class, module statements), OCaml (for & while loops), MATLAB (if & switch conditionals, for & while loops, try clause, package, classdef, properties, methods, events, & function blocks), Lua (then / else & function)
(begin ...)
 Scheme
(progn ...)
 Lisp
(do ...)
 Clojure

Indentation
 Off-side rule languages: Boo, Cobra, CoffeeScript, F#, Haskell (in do-notation when braces are omitted), LiveScript, occam, Python, Nemerle (Optional; the user may use white-space sensitive syntax instead of the curly-brace syntax if they so desire), Nim, Scala (Optional, as in Nemerle)
 Free-form languages: most descendants from ALGOL (including C, Pascal, and Perl); Lisp languages

Others
 Ada, Visual Basic, Seed7: if ... end if
 APL: :If ... :EndIf or :If ... :End
 Bash, sh, and ksh: if ... fi, do ... done, case ... esac;
 ALGOL 68: begin ... end, ( ... ), if ... fi, do ... od
 Lua, Pascal, Modula-2, Seed7: repeat ... until
 COBOL: IF ... END-IF, PERFORM ... END-PERFORM, etc. for statements; ... . for sentences.
 Visual Basic .Net: If ... End If, For ... Next, Do ... Loop
 Small Basic: If ... EndIf, For ... EndFor, While ... EndWhile

Comments 
Comments can be classified by:
 style (inline/block)
 parse rules (ignored/interpolated/stored in memory)
 recursivity (nestable/non-nestable)
 uses (docstrings/throwaway comments/other)

Inline comments 
Inline comments are generally those that use a newline character to indicate the end of a comment, and an arbitrary delimiter or sequence of tokens to indicate the beginning of a comment.

Examples:

Block comments 
Block comments are generally those that use a delimiter to indicate the beginning of a comment, and another delimiter to indicate the end of a comment. In this context, whitespace and newline characters are not counted as delimiters. In the examples, the symbol ~ represents the comment; and, the symbols surrounding it are understood by the interpreters/compilers as the delimiters.

Examples:

Unique variants 

Fortran
 Indenting lines in Fortran 66/77 is significant. The actual statement is in columns 7 through 72 of a line. Any non-space character in column 6 indicates that this line is a continuation of the previous line. A 'C' in column 1 indicates that this entire line is a comment. Columns 1 though 5 may contain a number which serves as a label. Columns 73 though 80 are ignored and may be used for comments; in the days of punched cards, these columns often contained a sequence number so that the deck of cards could be sorted into the correct order if someone accidentally dropped the cards. Fortran 90 removed the need for the indentation rule and added inline comments, using the ! character as the comment delimiter.

COBOL
 In fixed format code, line indentation is significant. Columns 1–6 and columns from 73 onwards are ignored. If a * or / is in column 7, then that line is a comment. Until COBOL 2002, if a D or d was in column 7, it would define a "debugging line" which would be ignored unless the compiler was instructed to compile it.

Cobra
 Cobra supports block comments with "/# ... #/" which is like the "/* ... */" often found in C-based languages, but with two differences. The # character is reused from the single-line comment form "# ...", and the block comments can be nested which is convenient for commenting out large blocks of code.

Curl
 Curl supports block comments with user-defined tags as in |foo# ... #foo|.

Lua
 Like raw strings, there can be any number of equals signs between the square brackets, provided both the opening and closing tags have a matching number of equals signs; this allows nesting as long as nested block comments/raw strings use a different number of equals signs than their enclosing comment: --[[comment --[=[ nested comment ]=] ]]. Lua discards the first newline (if present) that directly follows the opening tag.

Perl
 Block comments in Perl are considered part of the documentation, and are given the name Plain Old Documentation (POD). Technically, Perl does not have a convention for including block comments in source code, but POD is routinely used as a workaround.

PHP

 PHP supports standard C/C++ style comments, but supports Perl style as well.

Python
 The use of the triple-quotes to comment-out lines of source, does not actually form a comment. The enclosed text becomes a string literal, which Python usually ignores (except when it is the first statement in the body of a module, class or function; see docstring).

Raku
 Raku uses #`(...) to denote block comments. Raku actually allows the use of any "right" and "left" paired brackets after #` (i.e. #`(...), #`[...], #`{...}, #`<...>, and even the more complicated #`{{...}} are all valid block comments). Brackets are also allowed to be nested inside comments (i.e. #`{ a { b } c } goes to the last closing brace).

Ruby
 Block comment in Ruby opens at =begin line and closes at =end line.

S-Lang
 The region of lines enclosed by the #<tag> and #</tag> delimiters are ignored by the interpreter. The tag name can be any sequence of alphanumeric characters that may be used to indicate how the enclosed block is to be deciphered. For example, #<latex> could indicate the start of a block of LaTeX formatted documentation.

Scheme and Racket
 The next complete syntactic component (s-expression) can be commented out with #; .

ABAP
ABAP supports two different kinds of comments. If the first character of a line, including indentation, is an asterisk (*) the whole line is considered as a comment, while a single double quote (") begins an in-line comment which acts until the end of the line. ABAP comments are not possible between the statements EXEC SQL and ENDEXEC because Native SQL has other usages for these characters. In the most SQL dialects the double dash (--) can be used instead.

Esoteric languages
 Many esoteric programming languages follow the convention that any text not executed by the instruction pointer (e.g., Befunge) or otherwise assigned a meaning (e.g., Brainfuck), is considered a "comment".

Comment comparison 
There is a wide variety of syntax styles for declaring comments in source code.
BlockComment in italics is used here to indicate block comment style.
InlineComment in italics is used here to indicate inline comment style.

See also 
 C syntax
 C++ syntax
 Curly bracket programming languages, a broad family of programming language syntaxes
 Java syntax
 JavaScript syntax
 PHP syntax and semantics
 Python syntax and semantics

References

Notes 

Syntax